The Kite Runner is a 2007 American drama film directed by Marc Forster from a screenplay by David Benioff and based on the 2003 novel of the same name by Khaled Hosseini. It tells the story of Amir, a well-to-do boy from the Wazir Akbar Khan district of Kabul who is tormented by the guilt of abandoning his friend Hassan. The story is set against a backdrop of tumultuous events, from the fall of the monarchy in Afghanistan through the Soviet military intervention, the mass exodus of Afghan refugees to Pakistan and the United States, and the Taliban regime.

Though most of the film is set in Afghanistan, these parts were mostly shot in Kashgar in Xinjiang, China due to the dangers of filming in Afghanistan at the time.  The majority of the film's dialogue is in Persian Dari, with the remainder spoken in English and a few short scenes in Pashto and Urdu. The child actors are native speakers, but several adult actors had to learn Dari. Filming wrapped up on December 21, 2006, and the film was expected to be released on November 2, 2007. However, after concern for the safety of the young actors in the film due to fears of violent reprisals to the sexual nature of some scenes in which they appear, its release date was pushed back six weeks to December 14, 2007. The controversial scenes also resulted in the film being banned from cinemas and distribution in Afghanistan itself.

Made on a budget of $20 million, the film earned $73.2 million worldwide. The film received generally positive reviews from critics and was nominated for the Golden Globe Award for Best Foreign Language Film in 2007. The film's score by Alberto Iglesias was nominated for Best Original Score at the Golden Globes and the Academy Awards.

Plot

In San Francisco in 2000, Afghan-American writer Amir Qadiri and his wife Soraya watch children flying kites at a bayside park. Arriving home, Amir receives a call from his father's old friend and business associate, Rahim Khan, who lives in Peshawar, Pakistan.

In 1978 in Kabul, 10-year-old Amir is the son of a wealthy philanthropist and iconoclast, known locally by the honorific title Agha Sahib, whom Amir refers to as "Baba", meaning "father". Amir's best friend Hassan is the son of Baba's longtime servant, Ali. Amir participates in kite fighting, and Hassan serves as Amir's spool-holder and "kite runner". Hassan has a preternatural ability to predict where loose kites will land as well as deadly aim with his slingshot, and on Hassan's birthday, Amir gifts Hassan a slingshot made in the United States.

Amir enters the citywide kite-fighting contest, where he breaks his father's record of 14 "kills", and Hassan sprints off to "run" for the last defeated kite. After some time, Amir goes to look for Hassan, and finds him trapped in a dead end by Assef and his gang. Assef demands Amir's kite as a payment for letting Hassan go but Hassan refuses, asserting that the kite rightfully belongs to Amir. Assef then beats and rapes Hassan in retaliation. Amir watches unseen, unable to help Hassan and too afraid to intervene. He is wracked with guilt over the next few weeks and avoids Hassan, who privately teaches himself to read and write. Ali and Baba question Amir on Hassan's strange behavior, but Amir feigns ignorance. Amir asks his father if he has ever considered replacing Ali and Hassan, in response to which Baba angrily rebukes Amir.

Baba then throws a party for Amir's 11th birthday, but Amir, still upset by what happened to Hassan, cannot enjoy it. The next day, Amir plants his new wristwatch, a birthday present from his father, under Hassan's pillow, and tells everyone that Hassan stole it. Hassan is confronted by Baba, and instead of professing innocence, he takes the blame. Although Hassan is quickly forgiven, Ali tells Baba that he and his son can no longer work for him and are leaving immediately, much to Baba's distress.

In June 1979, the Soviet Union militarily intervenes. Baba leaves his house in the care of Rahim and flees to Pakistan with his son and other refugees across the border on an oil truck. Amir is frightened by their circumstances. Baba comforts Amir by having him recite poems.

In Fremont, California in 1988, Baba runs a service station and operates a stall at a weekly flea market. Amir earns a degree at a local community college, and Baba allows Amir to work with him at the station. One day, at the flea market, Baba introduces him to General Taheri, a Pashtun who is a former officer in the Afghan army. Amir meets Taheri's daughter, Soraya, whom he finds attractive. Later, Amir gives Soraya a copy of one of his stories, but the General confiscates it.

Soon after, Baba is diagnosed with terminal lung cancer. Amir asks his father to ask General Taheri’s for Amir to marry Soraya and Taheri gives his consent, but on a chaperoned stroll, Soraya tells Amir that when the Taheris  lived in Virginia, she had run away with a Pashtun man and lived with him until her father came to retrieve her. Soon after, the Taheris moved to California to escape the gossip about this. Amir is shocked by Soraya’s revelation, but still pledges his love, and they marry. Baba dies soon afterward.

The story then returns to the phone call in 2000: Rahim persuades Amir to visit him in Pakistan, offering him an opportunity to make amends. In Peshawar, Rahim, who is dying, tells Amir that he had asked Hassan to return, which he did-with his wife and his son Sohrab. Later, Rahim had fled to Pakistan and had left the home to Hassan and his family. Meanwhile, after the civil war, the Taliban had taken power. When the Taliban demanded that Hassan vacate the home, and Hassan refused, the Taliban had murdered him and his wife and Sohrab had been taken to an orphanage. After telling Amir of these events, Rahim urges Amir to return to Kabul to find Sohrab and give him a letter written by Hassan, who had taught himself to read and write. Amir declines until Rahim reveals that Amir and Hassan are biological half-brothers: Amir's father had had an affair with Ali's wife and had fathered Hassan.

Amir travels to a Kabul orphanage to seek Sohrab but learns that he had been taken away by a Taliban official. Amir arranges to get an appointment at the Taliban official's house, where he is surprised to find that the official's assistant is actually Assef, who recognizes Amir immediately. Assef introduces Sohrab as his dance boy and begins to beat Amir as payback for having let Sohrab leave. In the confusion, Sohrab pulls out the same slingshot that Amir had given to Hassan long ago and shoots Assef in the eye. Sohrab and an injured Amir then flee to Peshawar, where they find that Rahim has died, leaving behind a letter for Amir.

Back in San Francisco, Amir introduces Sohrab to Soraya, and the couple welcomes Sohrab into their home. Amir teaches Sohrab how to fly kites and volunteers to act as Sohrab's "runner". As Amir runs off to fetch a defeated kite, he repeats to Sohrab the words Hassan had said to Amir when they were boys: "For you, a thousand times over."

Cast
 Khalid Abdalla as Amir Qadiri, a young novelist who fled to the U.S. as a boy during the Soviet invasion of Afghanistan
 Zekeria Ebrahimi as Young Amir
 Ahmad Khan Mahmoodzada as Hassan, Amir's childhood friend who was the victim of brutal torment. It's later revealed Hassan was Amir's brother
 Homayoun Ershadi as the Agha Sahib (Baba)
 Atossa Leoni as Soraya, the daughter of General Taheri and Amir's spouse
 Shaun Toub as Rahim Khan
 Saïd Taghmaoui as Farid
 Abdul Salaam Yusoufzai as Assef, Amir and Hassan's childhood tormenter who became a Taliban official as an adult
 Elham Ehsas as Young Assef
 Ali Danish Bakhtyari as Sohrab
 Maimoona Ghezal as Jamila Taheri
 Abdul Qadir Farookh as General Taheri
 Khaled Hosseini (cameo) as Doctor in the park
 Camilo Cuervo as a Taliban Soldier
 Nasser Memarzia as Zaman, an orphanage director
 Mohamad Amin Rahimi as a Taliban official who made speeches in Ghazi Stadium
 Chris Verrill as Dr. Starobin, a Russian-American doctor
 Amar Kureishi as Dr. Amani, an Iranian doctor
 Nabi Tanha as Ali, Agha Sahib's house servant
 Ehsan Aman (cameo) as a singer at Amir's and Soraya's wedding
 Mehboob Ali as Amir's taxi driver in Pakistan

The two child actors were aged 11 and 12 at the time of the filming.

Production
Due to dangers of filming in Afghanistan, much of the film was recorded instead in the western Chinese city of Kashgar, which is located about 500 miles from Kabul and shares many visual similarities.

Critical reception

The film received generally positive reviews. , the film holds a 65% approval rating on Rotten Tomatoes based on 178 reviews, with an average rating of 6.40/10. The site's critics' consensus states: "Despite some fine performances, The Kite Runner is just shy of rendering the magic of the novel on to the big screen." On Metacritic, the film had an average score of 61 out of 100, based on 34 reviews.

Roger Ebert of the Chicago Sun-Times named it the 5th best film of 2007.

Controversy
Though the child actors enjoyed making the film, they and their families expressed worries about their situation after the film's release.  Regarding one scene, Ahmad Khan Mahmoodzada (young Hassan) said, "I want to continue making films and be an actor but the rape scene upset me because my friends will watch it and I won't be able to go outside any more. They will think I was raped." The scene was depicted in a less harrowing manner than originally planned; it contained no nudity, and the sexual aspect of the attack was suggested only very briefly at the end of the scene (also, a body double was used). There were also fears of intertribal reprisals, as the character Hassan was a Hazara and the boys who bullied and raped him were Pashtun.

The government of Afghanistan at the time, led by President Hamid Karzai, decided to ban the film from theaters and DVD shops, both because of the rape scene and the ethnic tensions. The deputy Information and Culture minister said: "It showed the ethnic groups of Afghanistan in a bad light. We respect freedom of speech, we support freedom of speech, but unfortunately we have difficulties in Afghan society, and if this film is shown in the cinemas, it is humiliating for one of our ethnic groups."

For their work on the movie, Zekeria Ebrahimi (young Amir) and Mahmoodzada were initially paid $17,500 (£9,000) each, and Ali Danish $13,700 (£7,000).  Arguments were later made that the boys were underpaid.  Additionally, Ebrahimi has said, "We want to study in the United States. It's a modern country and more safe than here in Kabul. If I became rich here I would be worried about security. It's dangerous to have money because of the kidnapping." Paramount relocated the two child actors, as well M. Ali Danish Bakhtyari (Sohrab) and another child actor with a minor role as Omar, to the United Arab Emirates. The studio reportedly accepted responsibility for the boys' living expenses until they reached adulthood, a cost some estimated at up to $500,000.

After four months in Dubai, Ebrahimi and his aunt returned to Kabul in March 2008.  After receiving threats on his life, Ebrahimi was forced to remain indoors and be home-schooled by an uncle. He has since claimed that he wishes he had never appeared in the movie. Mahmoodzada stayed in Dubai for two years but returned to Kabul because his other family members could not get a visa to join him. Back home, he was continuously targeted by both the Hazara Shia's (for portraying them as a weak community) and by Pashtun Sunni (for portraying them as bad and cruel). The repeated humiliation resulted in Mahmoodzada—with the help of human smugglers—moving to Sweden; as of 2017, he was living in Borlänge.

Awards and nominations

References

External links

 
 
 
 
 
 "A North Hollywood kite fighter's lofty dream", story of the film's kite master (Los Angeles Times)
 Kite Runner flies into controversy
 16 Days in Afghanistan listed as a reference film in Kite Runner's Study guide

2007 drama films
2007 films
American drama films
DreamWorks Pictures films
Films about atonement
Paramount Pictures films
Films set in Afghanistan
Films about immigration
Films based on American novels
Films directed by Marc Forster
Films set in Pakistan
Films set in Peshawar
Films set in the 1970s
Films set in the 1980s
Films set in the 1990s
Films set in the San Francisco Bay Area
Films shot in China
Films shot in Pakistan
2000s Persian-language films
Paramount Vantage films
Soviet–Afghan War films
Participant (company) films
Sidney Kimmel Entertainment films
Films about rape
Dari-language films
Films scored by Alberto Iglesias
Films produced by Walter F. Parkes
Films with screenplays by David Benioff
Films about refugees
Films about child sexual abuse
Works about kite flying
2000s English-language films
2007 multilingual films
American multilingual films
2000s American films

ja:君のためなら千回でも#映画